May Sho’ate (also called Argak'a) is a river of the Nile basin. Rising in the mountains of Dogu’a Tembien in northern Ethiopia, it flows southward to empty finally in Giba and Tekezé River.

Characteristics 
It is a confined ephemeral river with an average slope gradient of 121 metres per kilometre. With its tributaries, the river has cut a deep gorge.

May Zegzeg Integrated Catchment Management Project
As part of outreach accompanying research in Dogu'a Tembien, the May Zegzeg Integrated Catchment Management Project was set up in 2004 in the catchment of the May Zegzeg River by researchers in cooperation with ADCS, a local NGO. There was a particular focus on the May Sho’ate subcatchment. The project included the implementation of conservation techniques to increase water infiltration and conserve the soil. The objective was to improve the livelihood of the communities of Harena, Hech'i and Addi Qolqwal as well as to demonstrate and promote global catchment management in the district. The results of the implementation of site-specific conservation techniques aimed at increasing water infiltration and conserving soil were particularly monitored in the headwaters at May Sho'ate: dry masonry stone bunds, check dams in gullies, and the set-aside of degraded rangelands which resulted in exclosures.

Flash floods and flood buffering
Runoff mostly happens in the form of high runoff discharge events that occur in a very short period (called flash floods). These are related to the steep topography, often little vegetation cover and intense convective rainfall. The peaks of such flash floods have often a 50 to 100 times larger discharge than the preceding baseflow.

The magnitude of floods in this river has however been decreased due to interventions in the catchment by the May Zegzeg project, and other community activities. On the steep slopes, exclosures have been established; the dense vegetation largely contributes to enhanced infiltration, less flooding and better baseflow. Physical conservation structures such as stone bunds and check dams also intercept runoff.

Irrigated agriculture
 
Besides springs and reservoirs, irrigation is strongly dependent on the river's baseflow. Such irrigated agriculture is important in meeting the demands for food security and poverty reduction. Irrigated lands near springs that became strong after conservation activities: 
 Zenaqo in the upper catchment
 May Addi Abagiè, near the confluence of May Sho’ate and May Harena

Boulders and pebbles in the river bed
Boulders and pebbles encountered in the river bed can originate from any location higher up in the catchment. In the uppermost stretches of the river, only rock fragments of the upper lithological units will be present in the river bed, whereas more downstream one may find a more comprehensive mix of all lithologies crossed by the river. From upstream to downstream, the following lithological units occur in the catchment.
 Upper basalt
 Interbedded lacustrine deposits
 Lower basalt
 Amba Aradam Formation
 Antalo Limestone

Research catchment
Given its representativeness for the wider northern Ethiopian Highlands and the proximity to  Hagere Selam town, various research undertakings took place along May Sho’ate and in its catchment. These studies were particularly related to:
 Contribution of tillage erosion to landscape formation (monitoring study)
 Removal of rock fragments and its effect on soil loss and crop yield (study on experimental plots)
 Remobilisation of ancient mass movements (the May Ntebteb landslide)
 Impact of road building on gully erosion risk
 Causes of high stone cover in farm fields 
 Effectiveness of loose rock check dams for gully control (monitoring study) 
 Effectiveness of  stone bunds in controlling soil erosion (monitoring studies)
 Rainfall erosivity and variability (based on rain data collection) 
 Impacts of soil conservation on soil fertility and crop yield (monitoring study)
 Rockfall from the cliffs in the catchment and rock fragment displacement on scree slopes (monitoring study) 
 Soil mapping
 River sediment budget before and after land conservation
 Groundwater recharge monitoring
 Conservation agriculture (studies on experimental plots and in farmers fields) 
 Land use and soil erosion rates (study on experimental plots) 
 Water balance (monitoring study)
 Rodents harbouring in loose rock conservation structures

Natural boundary
During its course, this river constitutes the borders between Ayninbirkekin and Mika'el Abiy municipalities|.

Trekking along the river

Trekking routes have been established across and along this river. The tracks are not marked on the ground but can be followed using downloaded .GPX files.
 Trek 12, across the river and its upper catchment near Addi Qolqwal village
 Trek 12V, across the river and its lower catchment near Hech'i  and Harena villages

See also 
 List of Ethiopian rivers

References

Rivers of Ethiopia
Dogu'a Tembien
Tigray Region
Nile basin